Mansfield Chell Wrotto, Jr.  (born October 12, 1984 in Liberia) is a Liberian former American football guard who last played for the Chicago Bears of the National Football League. He was drafted by the Seattle Seahawks in the fourth round of the 2007 NFL Draft. He played college football at Georgia Tech.

College career
Wrotto played defensive tackle for three years, before moving to offensive tackle in his senior year.  In his four seasons at Georgia Tech, he only missed five games. He played in the Senior Bowl.

Professional career

Seattle Seahawks
Wrotto was drafted by the Seahawks in the fourth round of the 2007 NFL Draft, 124th overall. He was the first Georgia Tech player taken by Seattle in the draft since 1999 (Charlie Rogers). Though he played offensive tackle in college, he switched to guard for the Seahawks.

He was waived by the Seahawks on September 28, 2010.

Buffalo Bills
Wrotto was signed to the Buffalo Bills' practice squad on October 1 and signed to the active roster on October 4, 2010.

Chicago Bears
Wrotto was signed by the Chicago Bears on December 27, 2011.

On June 14, 2012, Wrotto was released by the Bears.

Personal
Wrotto graduated from Brookwood High School in Snellville, Ga, and then went on to attend Georgia Tech. At Georgia Tech he majored in management. His parents are Mansfield Sr. and Jemmie.

Wrotto is currently an MBA student at the University of Illinois at Urbana-Champaign.

References

External links
 Seattle Seahawks bio

1984 births
Living people
American football offensive guards
Georgia Tech Yellow Jackets football players
Seattle Seahawks players
Buffalo Bills players
Chicago Bears players